Anke Schäferkordt (born 12 December 1962) is a German businessperson who served as CEO of the RTL Group from 2012 until 2017. Besides that, she won the International Emmy Award for Directorate Award in 2013.

Early life and education
Schäferkordt grew up in the village of Henstorf, studied in a primary school in Kalletal and graduated in 1982 in Marianne-Weber-Gymnasium, Lemgo. Then, she studied business administration at the Paderborn University.

Career
Schäferkordt graduated in 1988, she began her professional career in the business management trainee program at Bertelsmann AG in Gütersloh. Schäferkordt has been with subsidiary of Bertelsmann RTL since 1991. For many years, she worked at the VOX television station, where she served as the managing director from 1999 to 2005.

In February 2005, Schäferkordt became Gerhard Zeilers' vice at RTL Germany. Since 1 September 2005 she has taken them as his successor the entire media group of RTL Alemanha; RTL Television, VOX, n-TV, RTL II, Super RTL, RTL NITRO, RTL Interactive, IP, infoNetwork e CBC. Schäferkordt was at the same time managing director of the RTL Television station. 

In 2012, Schäferkordt became CEO of the international RTL Group in Luxembourg, but kept their jobs for another year in Germany. In the same year, Schäferkordt was inducted into the German Advertising Hall of Fame.

On 1 February 2013 Schäferkordt handed over the position of CEO of RTL Television (Germany) to the managing director of VOX, Frank Hoffmann. In the same year, she won the International Emmy Award for Directorate Award. In 2017, Schäferkordt left the office as CEO of RTL Group.

Other activities
 BMW, Member of the Supervisory Board (since 2020) 
 Wayfair, Member of the board of directors (since 2019)
 Serviceplan, Member of the Supervisory Board (since 2019)
 BASF, Member of the Supervisory Board (2010–2022)
 M6 Group, Member of the Supervisory Board (2015–2018)
 Software AG, Member of the Supervisory Board (2010–2015)

Recognition
In 2007, Schäferkordt was named one of Europe's 25 top businesswomen in the Financial Times annual ranking.

References

External links
 Anke Schäferkordt in Bloomberg

1962 births
Businesspeople from North Rhine-Westphalia
Living people
RTL Group people
People from Lemgo